Jang So-Hee (born March 15, 1978) is a South Korean handball player who competed in the 2004 Summer Olympics.

In 2004, she won the silver medal with the South Korean team. She played all seven matches and scored 21 goals.

External links
profile

1978 births
Living people
South Korean female handball players
Olympic handball players of South Korea
Handball players at the 2004 Summer Olympics
Olympic silver medalists for South Korea
Olympic medalists in handball
Medalists at the 2004 Summer Olympics
Asian Games medalists in handball
Handball players at the 2002 Asian Games
Asian Games gold medalists for South Korea
Medalists at the 2002 Asian Games
21st-century South Korean women